Allantoma lineata (Portuguese common name: Seru) is a timber tree, typical of Amazon Rainforest vegetation. It is native to Amazonas State in Venezuela, and also to Amazonas and Pará States in Brazil.

References]

External links
Genetic information of Allantoma lineata 
 Allantoma lineata wood photo

Lecythidaceae
Trees of Brazil
Trees of Venezuela
Trees of the Amazon